Jericoacoara National Park is a national park of Brazil, located in the municipality of Jijoca de Jericoacoara, state of Ceará. On its seashore is located the famous Jericoacoara Beach.

About Jericoacoara 
The word Jericoacoara comes from Tupi (an indigenous language) and means "lair of turtles." 
It is a town and a beach of Ceará, as well as the name of the national park created in its surroundings. Jericoacoara is a location with favorable conditions for windsurfing and sandboarding.

A fact of some historical significance is the report of Vicente Yáñez Pinzón (Captain of Nau Nina, the fleet of Christopher Columbus), which anchored in the bay of Jericoacoara in 1499. 
But this was not official at the time as a result of the Treaty of Tordesillas, which was signed in the same year.

Park
The Jericoacoara Environmental Protection Area was established on 29 October 1984.
It included the village of Jericoacoara, and had .
On 4 February 2002 the Jericoacoara National Park was created, taking over from the state environmental protection area, and a federal environmental protection area was established on the outskirts of the village to prevent further growth into the ecologically fragile dunes.

References

External links
 Jericoacoara Park
 Jericuacuara.com - The Complete Guide to Jericoacoara

National parks of Brazil
Protected areas established in 1991
Protected areas of Ceará
1991 establishments in Brazil